The freguesias (civil parishes) of Portugal are listed in by municipality according to the following format:
 concelho
 freguesias

Redondo
Montoito
Redondo

Reguengos de Monsaraz
Campinho
Campo
Corval
Monsaraz
Reguengos de Monsaraz

Resende
Anreade
Barrô
Cárquere
Feirão
Felgueiras
Freigil
Miomães
Ovadas
Panchorra
Paus
Resende
São Cipriano
São João de Fontoura
São Martinho de Mouros
São Romão de Aregos

Ribeira Brava (Madeira)
Campanário
Ribeira Brava
Serra de Água
Tabua

Ribeira de Pena
Alvadia
Canedo
Cerva
Limões
Ribeira de Pena (Salvador)
Santa Marinha
Santo Aleixo de Além-Tâmega

Ribeira Grande (Azores)
Calhetas
Conceição
Fenais da Ajuda
Lomba da Maia
Lomba de São Pedro
Maia
Matriz
Pico da Pedra
Porto Formoso
Rabo de Peixe
Ribeira Seca
Ribeirinha
Santa Bárbara
São Brás

Rio Maior
Alcobertas
Arrouquelas
Arruda dos Pisões
Asseiceira
Assentiz
Azambujeira
Fráguas
Malaqueijo
Marmeleira
Outeiro da Cortiçada
Ribeira de São João
Rio Maior
São João da Ribeira
São Sebastião

R